Receptor-type tyrosine-protein phosphatase O is an enzyme that in humans is encoded by the PTPRO gene.

This gene encodes a receptor-type protein tyrosine phosphatase containing a single intracellular catalytic domain with a characteristic signature motif. The gene product, which has a transmembrane domain, is an integral membrane protein. Several alternatively spliced transcript variants, some of which encode different isoforms of the protein, have been described. These variants exhibit tissue-specific expression.

References

Further reading